Tirza is a 2010 Dutch drama film.

Tirza may also refer to:

Tirza Stream, a stream in West Bank
267 Tirza, main belt asteroid
Tirza Parish, Latvia
Tirza Porat, a victim of the Beita incident

See also

Tirzah (disambiguation)